Andrin Netzer (born 11 January 2002) is a Liechtenstein footballer who plays as a midfielder for Vaduz II and the Liechtenstein national team.

Career
Netzer made his international debut for Liechtenstein on 11 November 2020 in a friendly match against Malta.

Career statistics

International

References

External links
 
 

2002 births
Living people
Liechtenstein footballers
Liechtenstein youth international footballers
Liechtenstein under-21 international footballers
Liechtenstein international footballers
Association football midfielders
FC Vaduz players